Edward Carl Stearns (July 12, 1856 – April 21, 1929) was the founder of several companies in the late 19th century in Syracuse, New York, including E. C. Stearns & Company, Stearns Automobile Company, Stearns Steam Carriage Company, Stearns Typewriter Company and E. C. Stearns Bicycle Agency.

References

External links
 Memorial history of Syracuse, N.Y., from its settlement to the present time - Dwight Hall Bruce, Electronic Library, p. 649

1856 births
1929 deaths
Businesspeople from Syracuse, New York
19th-century American businesspeople
American railway entrepreneurs
Burials at Oakwood Cemetery (Syracuse, New York)